List of mosques of Dhaka division:

Kishoreganj district
 Shah Mohammad Mosque

Gazipur district

Gopalganj district

Tangail district
 Atia Mosque
 Kadimhamjani Mosque
 Rajbari Mosque
 Dhanbari Mosque
 Dhalapara Jame Mosque

Dhaka district
 Baitul Mukarram National Mosque
 Binat Bibi Mosque
 Chawk Mosque
 Kakrail Mosque
 Khan Mohammad Mridha Mosque
 Sat Gambuj Mosque
 Churihatta Mosque
 Star Mosque
 Kartalab Khan Mosque
 Musa Khan Mosque
 Lalbagh Shahi Mosque
 Shaista Khan Mosque

Narsingdi district

Narayanganj district
 Asrafia Jame Mosque
 Goaldi Mosque

Faridpur district

Madaripur district

Manikganj district

Munshiganj district
 Baba Adam's Mosque

Rajbari district
 Pangsha Government College Mosque
 Lakshandia Baitullah Jame Mosque
 Pangsha Upazila Mosque
 Machpara Jame Mosque
 Garal Jame Mosque

Shariatpur district

References

Dhaka Division
Buildings and structures in Dhaka Division